Inferior phrenic may refer to:
 Inferior phrenic veins
 Inferior phrenic arteries